Reidar Carlsen (1 July 1908 – 2 May 1987) was a Norwegian politician for the Labour Party.

Reidar Carlsen was born in Bodin in Nordland county, Norway. He studied at the National School of Forestry (Skogskolen) in the community of Steinkjer (1928–1929).

He was Member of Parliament of Norway from 1945 to 1961. He was Minister of Trade 1945–1946, and Minister of Fisheries 1946–1951. He served as Director of the Regional Development Fund 1961–78.

Awards
Petter Dass Medal (Petter Dass -medaljen) - (1955)
Order of St. Olav - (1968)
King Haakon VII 100-year Medal - (1972)

References

1908 births
1987 deaths
Government ministers of Norway
Members of the Storting
Labour Party (Norway) politicians
Innovation Norway people
Politicians from Bodø
20th-century Norwegian politicians